Yuen Sai Kit (born 19 December 1999) is a Hong Kong professional footballer who currently plays as a forward for Hong Kong Premier League club HK U23.

References

External links
 Yuen Sai Kit on the Hong Kong Football Association website

1999 births
Living people
Hong Kong footballers
Association football forwards
Happy Valley AA players
HK U23 Football Team players
Hong Kong Premier League players
Hong Kong First Division League players